Merchant service may refer to:
An alternative term for merchant navy
Merchant services, a category of financial services relating to business